The Grand Prix of Las Vegas was a sports car race held at the Las Vegas Motor Speedway near Las Vegas, Nevada.  It began as an IMSA GT Championship event in 1997, and became an American Le Mans Series event in 1999.  It has not been held since 2000.

Results

References

External links
Racing Sports Cars: Las Vegas archive

 
Recurring sporting events established in 1997